Africa Now! is a progressive weekly radio show that focuses on issues concerning the African world. It is based in Washington, D.C. The program airs on WPFW(89.3) radio, part of the Pacifica Radio network, in the Washington, D.C. metropolitan area. It also airs nationally and internationally online. It is listener supported.

Background
Africa Now! was founded on Pacifica Radio station in Washington, D.C. It brings together scholars, activists, authors, NGOs, and politicians to engage in topics centered on the African world.

Hosts
Mwiza Munthali, activist (2009 – current)

Notable guests, interviews and on-air debates
 Dr. Molefi Asante, African American scholar, historian, and philosopher
 Karen Bass,  U.S. Representative for California's 33rd congressional district.
 Dr. Horace G. Campbell, Jamaican-born, Noted international peace and justice scholar and Professor of African American Studies and Political Science at Syracuse University
 Dr. Clayborne Carson, African-American professor of history at Stanford University, and director of the Martin Luther King, Jr., Research and Education Institute
 Dr. Johnnetta B. Cole, African-American academic, and Director of the Smithsonian Institution’s National Museum of African Art
 Edwidge Danticat, Haitian-American author
 Walter Fauntroy, American pastor, civil rights activist and politician
 Haile Gerima Ethiopian-born independent filmmaker, scholar,  and activist
 Danny Glover, American actor/activist
 Dr. Sylvia Hill, African-American scholar, activist
 Ahmed Kathrada, South African politician and former anti-apartheid activist
 Dr. Clarence Lusane, African-American scholar/activist
 Firoze Manji, Kenyan-born author, publisher
 Gay McDougal, UN rapporteur on minority rights and law professor.
 Dr. Ronald Walters, leading African-American scholar/activist

References

External links
Africa Now! website
WPFW
TransAfrica Forum

1998 radio programme debuts
Pacifica Foundation programs
Progressive talk radio
Works about Africa